Psychiko B.C. (alternate spelling: Psychikou) is a Greek professional basketball club that is located in Psychiko, Greece. The athletic club's full name is Athlitiki Enosi Psychikou (Greek: Αθλητική Ένωση Ψυχικού), which is abbreviated as A.E.PS. (Α.Ε.Ψ.), and which means Athletic Union of Psychiko.The home of the team is a small indoor hall called Psychiko Indoor Hall.

History
Psychiko was founded in 1985, by Dimitris Chouliarakis, who was the President of the club, until his death in 2013. In 2012, the club was promoted to the Greek 2nd Division, because of the relegation of Panellinios, due to their financial problems. Since 2013, Psychiko has been competing in the Greek 2nd Division. In 2022, Psychiko finally achieved a promotion to the Greek Basket League, but subsequently failed to gather the legal paperwork and monetary funds required in order to compete in the 2022-2023 season.

Arena
The club plays its home games at the Psychiko Indoor Hall, a small arena with a capacity of about 300.

Titles and honors
Greek 3rd Division Champion: (2013)

Roster

Notable players

  Ioannis Dimakos
  Christos Iordanou
  Antonis Mantzaris
  Dimitris Marmarinos
  Vassilis Mouratos
  Petros Noeas
 - Alfa Ntiallo
  Nikos Papanikolaou
 - Nick Paulos
  Alekos Petroulas
  Nikos Pettas
  Michalis Polytarchou
  Ioannis Psathas
  John Sinis
  Damir Latović

References

External links
Official website 
Eurobasket.com Team Page

Basketball teams in Greece